Kirchroth is a municipality in the district of Straubing-Bogen in Bavaria, Germany. It lies on the Danube River. By the local government reform of May 1978 villages Kößnach, Oberzeitldorn, Obermiethnach, Pillnach, Pondorf, Niederachdorf, as well as Aufroth and Neuroth were incorporated.

Notable people
The social democratic politician Albert Roßhaupter (1878–1962) was born in the district Pillnach.

References

Straubing-Bogen
Populated places on the Danube